Stadion Galgenwaard is a football stadium in Utrecht, Netherlands. It has been the home of the FC Utrecht since 1970. The stadium, which underwent a renovation starting at the beginning of the 21st century, has a capacity of 23,750 spectators.

The stadium reopened in 1982 after an extensive facelift. At the time it was one of the most modern stadiums in the world, especially due to the moat around the pitch. After twenty years FC Utrecht felt the need for expansion and renewal. The main stand was moved to the North side and opened for the start of the 2001–2002 season.

The old main stand was rebuilt after that and a year later FC Utrecht had two new stands along the sides of the pitch. Last season, the goal stands were replaced, and the stadium now has 23,750 seats.

Seven international matches of the Netherlands national football team have been played in the stadium. The first was a friendly on 27 April 1983 against Sweden which ended 3–0 for the visitors. The most recent, played on 3 September 2004, was also a friendly: a 3–0 win against Liechtenstein.

The stadium was also the host of 2 World Cup finals. In 1998, the Netherlands hockey team became world champions, beating Spain in the final 3–2. In 2005, the final of the Football World Youth Championship was played in the Galgenwaard. Argentina won, beating Nigeria 2–1.

During the UEFA Women's Euro 2017, the stadium hosted 4 group stage matches.

References

External links
 
  VoetbalStats
  Stadion Galgenwaard

FC Utrecht
Galgenwaard
Sports venues in Utrecht (city)
UEFA Women's Euro 2017 venues